Brion-sur-Ource (literally Brion on Ource) is a commune in the Côte-d'Or department in eastern France.

Geography
The Ource forms part of the commune's western border, then flows north-northeast through the northern part of the commune, where it crosses the village.

Population

See also
Communes of the Côte-d'Or department

References

Communes of Côte-d'Or
Côte-d'Or communes articles needing translation from French Wikipedia